Kennelly is a surname. Notable people with the surname include:

 Ardyth Kennelly (1912–2005), American novelist
 Arthur E. Kennelly (1861–1939), American engineer
 Barbara B. Kennelly (born 1936), Connecticut Representative
 Brendan Kennelly (1936–2021), Irish poet and novelist
 Jerry Kennelly, Irish photojournalist, founder of Stockbyte and Tweak.com
 Joan Kennelly (died 2007), Irish photojournalist
 Keala Kennelly (born 1978), American surfer
 Martin H. Kennelly (1887–1961), mayor of Chicago
 Matt Kennelly (Mathew Luke Kennelly; born 1989), Australian baseball player
 Matthew F. Kennelly (born 1956), Federal District Court Judge in Illinois
 Michael Kennelly (1914–2011), American Jesuit Catholic priest, President of the Loyola University New Orleans (1970–1974)
 Noel Kennelly, Irish Gaelic football player
 Pádraig Kennelly (1929–2011), Irish journalist, editor and photographer
 Pat Kennelly (1900–1981), Australian politician
 Paul Kennelly (born 1947), Australian rules footballer
 Richard Kennelly (born 1965), American Olympic rower
 Ryan Kennelly (born 1974), American powerlifter
 Sheila Kennelly (born 1927), Australian actress
 Tadhg Kennelly (born 1981), Irish Gaelic football player
 Tim Kennelly (1954–2005), Irish Gaelic football player
 Tim Kennelly (baseball) (born 1986), Australian baseball player

See also
 Kennelly–Heaviside layer, a layer of the Earth's ionosphere
 Kenneally (disambiguation)